Windows IT Pro was a trade publication and web site owned by Informa serving the information needs of IT professionals working with the Microsoft Windows platform. The magazine's editorial offices were located in Ft. Collins, Colorado, USA. It was in circulation between 1995 and April 2014.

It is now exist as ITPro Today web publication.

History and profile
Established in 1995 as Windows NT Magazine in North America and NTexplorer Magazine in Europe, Windows IT Pro publishes a monthly digital magazine; produces web content, web seminars, and elearning training sessions; and hosts conferences for IT professionals. Common topics include Windows Server, Windows client, Microsoft Exchange Server, Microsoft Outlook, virtualization, cloud computing, Microsoft System Center, Active Directory, Group Policy, and PowerShell/Scripting.

Windows IT Pro's sister web sites include Paul Thurrott's SuperSite for Windows, SQL Server Pro, SharePoint Pro, Dev Pro, and myITforum.com.

References

External links
ITPro Today

Technology websites
1995 establishments in Colorado
2014 disestablishments in Colorado
Monthly magazines published in the United States
Business magazines published in the United States
Defunct computer magazines published in the United States
Magazines established in 1995
Magazines disestablished in 2014
Magazines published in Colorado
Mass media in Fort Collins, Colorado
Microsoft Windows magazines
Online magazines published in the United States
Professional and trade magazines